Andrea Kelly is an American dancer and actress. It may also refer to:

 Andrea Kelly (curler), a Canadian curler previously known as Andrea Crawford
 Andrea Kelly Kilfeather, a member of Irish girl group Bellefire